La Friche de la Belle de Mai or La Friche (English: The Fallow; The Wasteland) is a former tobacco factory near the Saint-Charles station in Marseille, France, in the neighbourhood of Belle de Mai.

In 1992, it was converted into a cultural complex. Presenting itself as a "pole of authors," the Wasteland focuses its efforts primarily on the creation and production of works. It hosts dozens of international artists in residence  and it contains over sixty artistic and cultural structures of all disciplines (theater, dance, music, contemporary art, radio).  It is also a place of spectacle and broadcasting, it contains 2 concert rooms (Le cabaret aléatoire, 900 places, and La cartonnerie, 1,200 places), it hosted several times the electronic and urban music festival Marsatac. La Friche includes as well a restaurant, a nursery, a playground for children, a library, a local food market, a skate shop, a skate park, family and community gardens and two new theaters. The Mediterranean Institute of Show Crafts will open there in 2014.

In 2013 was built the Panorama Tower, for the European Capital of Culture, a 4,000 m2 exhibition space dedicated to contemporary art. 
In the same time, 7,500 m2 of the building "Les Magazins" were renovated and host offices and art studios. A large public terrasse (8,000 m2) has been created on the roof of the building and regularly hosts events and dj sets.

References

Culture of Marseille
Tourist attractions in Marseille